The Comptroller of the Treasury was an official of the United States Department of the Treasury from 1789 to 1817. According to section III of the Act of Congress establishing the Treasury Department, it is the comptroller's duty to

superintend the adjustment and preservation of the public accounts; to examine all accounts settled by the Auditor, and certify the balances arising thereon to the Register; to countersign all warrants drawn by the Secretary of the Treasury, which shall be warranted by law; to report to the Secretary the official forms of all papers to be issued in the different offices for collecting the public revenue, and the manner and form of keeping and stating the accounts of the several persons employed therein. He shall moreover provide for the regular and punctual payment of all monies which may be collected, and shall direct prosecutions for all delinquencies of officers of the revenue, and for debts that are, or shall be due to the United States.

The first person to hold this office was Nicholas Eveleigh. It was also held for a time by Gabriel Duvall, who would later serve on the Supreme Court of the United States. The office was later several times renamed. It was the First Comptroller of the Treasury (1817–20), the Agent of the Treasury (1820–30), and Solicitor of the Treasury (1830–1934), and is now the Office of the General Counsel.

References

External links
Fact sheet on the Act of Congress establishing the Treasury Department

 

Eveleigh's biographic note on the web page for the Biographical Directory of the United States Congress  1774 - Present 
https://bioguideretro.congress.gov/Home/MemberDetails?memIndex=E000263